Howard Dean was a Governor of Vermont, candidate for President of the United States, and Chairman of the Democratic National Committee.

Vermont elections

United States presidential election, 2004
2004 Democratic presidential primaries:
John Kerry - 9,930,497 (60.98%)
John Edwards - 3,162,337 (19.42%)
Howard Dean - 903,460 (5.55%)
Dennis Kucinich - 620,242 (3.81%)
Wesley Clark - 547,369 (3.36%)
Al Sharpton - 380,865 (2.34%)
Joe Lieberman - 280,940 (1.73%)
Uncommitted - 157,953 (0.97%)
Lyndon LaRouche - 103,731 (0.64%)
Carol Moseley Braun - 98,469 (0.61%)
Dick Gephardt - 63,902 (0.39%)

References

Dean, Howard
Howard Dean